The 1962 WCHA Men's Ice Hockey Tournament was the 3rd conference playoff in league history. The tournament was played between March 1 and March 3, 1962. All games were played at the Weinberg Coliseum in Ann Arbor, Michigan. By reaching the title game both Michigan Tech and Michigan were invited to participate in the 1962 NCAA Division I Men's Ice Hockey Tournament.

Format
The top four teams in the WCHA, based upon the conference regular season standings, were eligible for the tournament and were seeded No. 1 through No. 4. The entire tournament consisted of single-elimination games. In the first round the first and fourth seeds and the second and third seeds were matched with winners advanced to the championship game and the losers playing in a third-place game.

Conference standings
Note: GP = Games played; W = Wins; L = Losses; T = Ties; PCT = Winning percentage; GF = Goals for; GA = Goals against

Bracket

Note: * denotes overtime period(s)

Semifinals

(1) Michigan Tech vs. (4) Michigan State

(2) Michigan vs. (3) Denver

Third-place game

(1) Denver vs. (2) Michigan State

Championship Game

(1) Michigan Tech vs. (2) Michigan

Tournament awards
None

See also
Western Collegiate Hockey Association men's champions

References

External links
WCHA.com
1961–62 WCHA Standings
1961–62 NCAA Standings
2013–14 Denver Pioneers Media Guide
2013–14 Michigan Wolverines Media Guide; Through the Years
2013–14 Michigan State Spartans Media Guide; Section 5

WCHA Men's Ice Hockey Tournament
Wcha Men's Ice Hockey Tournament
Sports in Ann Arbor, Michigan